Haskovo Cove (Zaliv Haskovo \'za-liv 'ha-sko-vo\) is a 2.1 km wide cove indenting for 1 km the northern coast of Greenwich Island between Aprilov Point and Miletich Point in the South Shetland Islands, Antarctica.  Situated next east of Crutch Peaks, southwest of Ongley Island and northwest of Sevtopolis Peak. Shape enhanced as a result of Teteven Glacier’s retreat in the late 20th and early 21st century.  The cove is named after the city of Haskovo in Southeastern Bulgaria.

Location

Maps
 L.L. Ivanov et al. Antarctica: Livingston Island and Greenwich Island, South Shetland Islands. Scale 1:100000 topographic map. Sofia: Antarctic Place-names Commission of Bulgaria, 2005.
 L.L. Ivanov. Antarctica: Livingston Island and Greenwich, Robert, Snow and Smith Islands. Scale 1:120000 topographic map.  Troyan: Manfred Wörner Foundation, 2009.

References
Haskovo Cove. SCAR Composite Gazetteer of Antarctica.
 Bulgarian Antarctic Gazetteer. Antarctic Place-names Commission. (details in Bulgarian, basic data in English)

External links
 Haskovo Cove. Copernix satellite image

Coves of Greenwich Island
Bulgaria and the Antarctic
Haskovo